Aurora Lovisa Ljungstedt (Hjort; pseudonym, Claude Gérard; 2 September 1821 - 21 February 1908), was a Swedish writer. She is regarded to be the first crime novel author of her country and has been referred to as Sweden's Edgar Allan Poe.

Life
Aurora Lovisa Hjort was born 2 September 1821, in Karlskrona. She was the eldest of four children of major Georg Leonard Hjort (1788-1872) and Fredrika Elisabeth Alf (1792-1877). In 1846, she married Samuel Viktor Ljungstedt (1820-1904), an official in the prison care bureau, and settled in Stockholm. She had three children.

Ljungstedt displayed talent early on but her mother disapproved of a literary career as unsuitable as this would make her a public person. After having married, she was free to write with the support of her spouse. She debuted in the 1840s, and wrote anonymously until her pseudonym was unintentionally exposed in the 1870s.

Her crime novels were very successful in Sweden and were also translated to French and Danish. She was inspired by Eugéne Sue and Edward Bulwer and wrote crime novels in the then fashionable sensationalist horror style, often with supernatural phenomena.  

Ljungstedt died 21 February 1908, in Stockholm.

Bibliography

Serials
Dagdrifverier och drömmerier  1857 in Aftonbladet
En jägares historier 1860-1861 in Nya Dagligt Allehanda
Skymningsprat 1864 in Nya Dagligt Allehanda
Psykologiska gåtor 1868 in Nya Dagligt Allehanda
Onkel Benjamins album 1870 in Nya Dagligt Allehanda
Jernringen 1871 in Nya Dagligt Allehanda
Moderna typer 1872 in Nya Dagligt Allehanda
Den svarta kappan 1872 in Svenska Familj-Journalen
Inom natt och år 1875 in Aftonbladet
Hvardagsliv 1877 in Aftonbladet
Gröna Blad 1877 in Aftonbladet
Den tomma rymden 1878 in Aftonbladet

Books
Hin ondes hus 1853 (pseud Richard)
Psykologiska gåtor 1868
Samlade berättelser:
   Dagdrifverier och drömmerier och En jägares historier 1872
   Skymningsprat 1872
	Onkel Benjamins album 1873
	Jernringen 1873
	Psykologiska gåtor 1873
	Moderna typer 1874
	Inom natt och år 1876
	Hvardagslif och Gröna blad 1878
	Diverse berättelser 1882:  "Den tomma rymden", "Svarta kappan", "Gnistor i mörkret", "Tönne Rolf", "Små salongsstycken"
Mr. Webb: reseskizz 1873
Linné i Uppsala och Amsterdam 1878
Soldaten Blå: historisk skizz från Gustaf IV Adolfs tid 1879
Onkel Benjamins album (ny upplaga) 1903
Två sällsamma berättelser (delvis omarbetad upplaga av "En gubbes minnen" och "Harolds skugga" från En jägares historier) 2002
Hastfordska vapnet (fristående långnovell eller kortroman från Onkel Benjamins album) 2006

Sources 
 Aurora L Ljungstedt, urn:sbl:9625, Svenskt biografiskt lexikon (art av Sven Erik Täckmark), hämtad 2015-11-08.

External links
 

1821 births
1908 deaths
19th-century Swedish women writers
19th-century Swedish writers
Swedish horror writers